Donald Carl Johanson (born June 28, 1943) is an American paleoanthropologist. He is known for discovering, with Yves Coppens and Maurice Taieb, the fossil of a female hominin australopithecine known as "Lucy" in the Afar Triangle region of Hadar, Ethiopia.

Biography

Early life and education 
Johanson was born in Chicago, Illinois to Swedish parents. He is the nephew of wrestler Ivar Johansson.

He earned a bachelor's degree from the University of Illinois at Urbana–Champaign in 1966 and his master's degree (1970) and PhD (1974) from the University of Chicago. At the time of the discovery of Lucy, he was an associate professor of anthropology at Case Western Reserve University. In 1981, he established the Institute of Human Origins in Berkeley, California, which he moved to Arizona State University in 1997. Johanson holds an honorary doctorate from Case Western Reserve University and was awarded an honorary doctorate by Westfield State College in 2008. He is an atheist.

"Lucy" 

Lucy was discovered in Hadar, Ethiopia on November 24, 1974 when the team, directed by paleontologists Yves Coppens, Maurice Taieb and Johanson, coaxed away from his paperwork by graduate student Tom Gray for a spur-of-the-moment survey, caught the glint of a white fossilized bone out of the corner of his eye and recognized it as hominin. Forty percent of the skeleton was eventually recovered and was later described as the first known member of Australopithecus afarensis. Johanson was astonished to find so much of her skeleton all at once. Pamela Alderman, a member of the expedition, suggested she be named "Lucy" after the Beatles' song "Lucy in the Sky with Diamonds," which was played repeatedly during the night of the discovery.

A bipedal hominin, Lucy stood about three and a half feet tall; her bipedalism supported Raymond Dart's theory that australopithecines walked upright. The whole team including Johanson concluded from Lucy's rib  that she ate a plant-based diet and from her curved finger bones that she was probably still at home in trees. They did not immediately see Lucy   as a separate species, but considered her an older member of Australopithecus africanus. The subsequent discovery of several more skulls of similar morphology persuaded most palaeontologists to classify her as a species called afarensis.

Johanson and Maitland A. Edey won a 1982 U.S. National Book Award in Science for the first popular book about this work, Lucy: The Beginnings of Humankind.

"First Family" 

AL 333, commonly referred to as the "First Family", is a collection of prehistoric homininid teeth and bones of at least thirteen individuals that were also discovered in Hadar by Johanson's team in 1975. Generally thought to be members of the species Australopithecus afarensis, the fossils are estimated to be about 3.2 million years old.

Awards and honors 
 In 1976, Johanson received the Golden Plate Award of the American Academy of Achievement.
 In 1991, the Committee for Skeptical Inquiry (CSICOP) awarded Johanson their highest honor, the In Praise of Reason award.
 On October 19, 2014, Johanson gave the second annual Patrusky Lecture.
 On October 24, 2014, Johanson accepted the "Emperor Has No Clothes" award at the Freedom From Religion Foundation 37th annual convention.
 Asteroid 52246 Donaldjohanson, a target of the Lucy mission was named in his honor. The official  was published by the Minor Planet Center on December 25, 2015.

Other activities 

Since 2013, Johanson has been listed on the Advisory Council of the National Center for Science Education.

Bibliography

See also 
 Yves Coppens
 Australopithecus afarensis
 Dawn of Humanity (2015 PBS film)
 List of fossil sites (with link directory)
 List of hominina (hominin) fossils (with images)
 Multi-regional origin
 Single-origin hypothesis

Notes

References

External links 

 Institute of Human Origins at Arizona State University
 
In Search of Human Origins – PBS
 Lucy's Legacy: The Quest for Human Origins – Video
 NPR. Science Friday. "Human Origins" – May 9, 1997 interview with Johanson.
 NPR. Science Friday.  "Lucy's Relative" – December 1, 2006 interview with Johanson.
 NPR. Science Friday. "Lucy's Legacy" – March 6, 2009 interview with Johanson.
 "Origins of Modern Humans: Multiregional or Out of Africa?" by Donald Johanson
 

1943 births
20th-century atheists
21st-century atheists
American anthropologists
American anthropology writers
American atheists
American male non-fiction writers
Anthropology educators
Human evolution theorists
Arizona State University faculty
National Book Award winners
Paleoanthropologists
University of Illinois Urbana-Champaign alumni
University of Chicago alumni
Living people
American people of Swedish descent